G. A. Henry (born Gustavus Adolphus Henry Sr.; October 4, 1804 – September 10, 1880) was an American politician who served as a Confederate States senator from Tennessee from 1862 to 1865.

Biography
Gustavus Adolphus Henry Sr. was born in 1804. He was the son of Gen. William Henry and Elizabeth Julia (Flournoy) Henry. He was a classmate in law school with Jefferson Davis. He established a practice in Tennessee prior to the American Civil War. He became a wealthy businessman, owning cotton plantations in Hinds County, Mississippi and Desha County, Arkansas. Affiliated with the Whig Party, he campaigned for Henry Clay. In 1853, he was that party's candidate for governor, losing to Democrat Andrew Johnson by around 2250 votes. He served in the Confederate States of America Senate from 1862–65 and was widely known as the "Eagle Orator of Tennessee." Through his personal friendship with President Davis, he was influential in the Confederate government. As senator, he was a powerful member of the finance and military committees. Early in the war, the state of Tennessee commissioned the construction of a pair of forts to protect the Tennessee and Cumberland Rivers. The fort on the Tennessee River was named "Fort Henry" in the Senator's honor (see Battle of Fort Henry). He died in 1880.

Legacy
Henry owned Emerald Hill, a large mansion overlooking the Cumberland River in Clarksville, Tennessee now listed in the National Register of Historic Places and serves as the alumni center for the neighboring Austin Peay State University.

References

External links
Tennessee history

1804 births
1880 deaths
19th-century American politicians
Confederate States of America senators
People of Tennessee in the American Civil War
Tennessee Whigs